Człuchów railway station is a railway station serving the town of Człuchów, in the Pomeranian Voivodeship, Poland. The station is located on the Chojnice–Runowo Pomorskie railway and Człuchów–Słosinko railway. The train services are operated by Przewozy Regionalne.

The station was previously known as Schlochau (until 1945) and Słuchów (1945-1946).

Train services
The station is served by the following service(s):

Regional services (R) Słupsk — Miastko — Szczecinek — Chojnice
Regional services (R) Szczecinek — Chojnice

References 

Człuchów article at Polish Stations Database, URL accessed at 7 March 2006

External links 
 

Railway stations in Pomeranian Voivodeship
Człuchów County